Ulverstone Secondary College (formerally Ulverstone High School) is a government comprehensive secondary school located in , in the Central Coast region of Tasmania, Australia. Established in 1953, the school caters for approximately 600 students from Years 7 to 12. The college is administered by the Tasmanian Department for Education, Children and Young People.

In 2023 student enrolments were 550. The college principal is Simon Dent. The school is one of the few high schools in Tasmania to cater for hearing impaired students.

History
The school was established in 1953 as it was to help the surrounding communities gain into high school. In March 2015, the school received an international entry as a collaborative team in the F1 in Schools competition held in Singapore. In March 2017, the school was one of eighteen high schools to be expanded to cover Years 11 and 12. In 2019 Ulverstone High School was officially renamed Ulverstone Secondary College to reflect the new 11/12 offering.

Houses
The school student body is divided into four houses: Tasman (red), Flinders (Yellow), Furenaux (Green) and Bass (Blue). Each house is run under the guidance of its elected house captain (also a member of the SLC.) The house point system is put into effect at school swimming, cross-Country, athletic and surf carnivals, with students gaining points for their house through participation and placing. The winning house of each event is rewarded with their house name and year engraved on the selected activity's shield.

See also 
Education in Tasmania
List of schools in Tasmania

References

External links
 Ulverstone Secondary College
 Department of Education

Public high schools in Tasmania
Educational institutions established in 1953
1953 establishments in Australia
Ulverstone, Tasmania